Grace Hoffman (born Goldie Hoffman; January 14, 1921July 26, 2008) was an American operatic mezzo-soprano and academic teacher. Based at the Staatsoper Stuttgart from 1955 to 1992, she performed roles such as Verdi's Azucena and Eboli at leading opera houses in Europe and the Americas. Her signature role was Wagner's Brangäne, performed at the Bayreuth Festival, among others.

Life 
Goldie Hoffman was born on January 14, 1921, in Cleveland, Ohio, to a family of Hungarian origin. She studied literature and musicology and received her first vocal training from Lila Robeso, then with Friedrich Schorr and Giuseppe Gentile as well as Mario Basiola in Rome.

In 1951 she won a singing competition in Lausanne. She made her debut in 1951 with the touring Wagner Opera Company as Lucia in Mascagni's Cavalleria rusticana. The same year, she appeared as the Priestess in Verdi's Aida at the Maggio Musicale Fiorentino. In 1952, she performed at the Opernhaus Zürich as Azucena in Verdi's Il trovatore and remained there until 1955. She then moved to the Staatsoper Stuttgart, where she was a member of the ensemble until 1992. She appeared as a guest at La Scala in Milan in 1955, in the role of Fricka in Wagner's Die Walküre, opposite Martha Mödl, Wolfgang Windgassen, and Hans Hotter. She returned to that theatre in 1974, for Herodias in Salome, with Dame Gwyneth Jones. The dramatic mezzo-soprano performed regularly at the Royal Opera House in London and the Vienna State Opera, where she sang from 1961 to 1990.

Hoffman performed at the Bavarian State Opera, the San Francisco Opera, the Teatro Colón in Buenos Aires, the Paris Opéra, the Deutsche Oper Berlin, the Deutsche Oper am Rhein, the Opéra national de Bordeaux, the Teatro Comunale Bologna, La Fenice in Venice, Teatro San Carlo in Naples, La Monnaie in Brussels, the Copenhagen Opera House, the Philadelphia Opera, and the Liceu in Barcelona.

In 1958, she had an engagement at the Metropolitan Opera in New York as Brangäne in Tristan und Isolde, with Ramón Vinay and Mödl. She returned to the Met in 1971, again in Tristan und Isolde, now opposite Jess Thomas, Birgit Nilsson, and John Macurdy, conducted by Erich Leinsdorf.  In 1964, she sang Elisabetta in a concert version of Donizetti's Maria Stuarda at Carnegie Hall.

From 1957 to 1970, Hoffman performed at the Bayreuth Festival in her signature role as Brangäne in Tristan und Isolde (1957–59, 1966, 1968–70), as well as in Der Ring des Nibelungen as Siegrune (1958, 1960–64), Waltraute (1960–61, 1964, 1968–69), the Second Norn (1961–64) and Fricka (1962–64), in 1967–68 also as Ortrud in Lohengrin.  A few months after the death of Wieland Wagner, Bayreuth toured his production to the Osaka International Festival, in 1967, of Die Walküre, when Hoffman portrayed Fricka with Anja Silja, Theo Adam, Helge Dernesch, and Thomas, conducted by Thomas Schippers. It was televised, though it has never been published commercially.

In 1978, Hoffman was appointed a professor at the State University of Music and Performing Arts Stuttgart but continued her singing career. In 1988, she appeared as Mother Wesener in Bernd Alois Zimmermann's Die Soldaten at the Opéra du Rhin, a role she again played at the Vienna State Opera in 1990.  She recorded the part for Teldec in 1988–89, opposite Nancy Shade, conducted by Bernhard Kontarsky.  In 1989, the production was filmed and published on video-cassette, then DVD.

Among her other recordings are Herodias in Salome, with Nilsson, led by Sir Georg Solti, for Decca in 1961; Amneris in excerpts from Aida, led by Sir John Pritchard, with Nilsson, Luigi Ottolini, and Louis Quilico, in 1963 for Decca; Gertrud in Hänsel und Gretel, conducted by André Cluytens, for EMI in 1963–64; and Messiah, led by Otto Klemperer, with Dame Elisabeth Schwarzkopf, Nicolai Gedda, and Jerome Hines, for EMI in 1965.

Hoffman was awarded the title Kammersängerin. She lived in Neckartailfingen near Stuttgart. Her grave is in Cleveland.

Honors 
 Honorary member of the Stuttgart Opera
 Order of Merit of Baden-Württemberg (1978)

References

External links 
 
 
 Grace Hoffman (Mezzo-soprano) Bach Cantatas Website

American operatic mezzo-sopranos
Recipients of the Order of Merit of Baden-Württemberg
1921 births
2008 deaths
Musicians from Cleveland
American emigrants to Germany
American people of Hungarian descent
20th-century American women
20th-century American people
American expatriates in Switzerland
21st-century American women